Courset is a commune in the Pas-de-Calais department in the Hauts-de-France region of France.

Geography

Population

Places of interest
 The church of St. Maurice, dating from the sixteenth century.
 The nineteenth-century chateau de Courset.
 The seventeenth-century manorhouse of la Gaverie.
 Remains of an old castle.

See also
Communes of the Pas-de-Calais department

References

Communes of Pas-de-Calais